The 1899 Villanova Wildcats football team represented the Villanova University during the 1899 college football season. The team's captain was Dick Nallin.

Schedule

References

Villanova
Villanova Wildcats football seasons
Villanova Wildcats football